Kurdish Tribal Association is a Kurdish tribal grouping (of about 20 to 30 tribes), established 1991 in Iraqi Kurdistan.

References
Iraqi Opposition

Kurdish organisations
Kurdish political parties in Iraq
Political parties in Kurdistan Region
Political parties established in 1991
1991 establishments in Iraqi Kurdistan